The Roman Catholic Diocese of Ba Ria is a Latin rite suffragan diocese in the ecclesiastical province of the Metropolitan Archdiocese of Ho Chi Minh city, in southern Vietnam, yet it depends on the missionary Roman Congregation for the Evangelization of Peoples.

Its cathedral episcopal see is Cathedral of Mary, Mother of God, dedicated to the Apostles Saint Philip and Saint James, in Bà Rịa city, Bà Rịa–Vũng Tàu province, Southeastern Vietnam.

History 
The bishopric was established on 22 November 2005 as Diocese of Ba Ria / Bà Rịa (Tiếng Việt) / 巴地 (正體中文) / Barianen(sis) (Latin adjective), on territory detached from the Diocese of Xuân Lôc.

According to Jesuit missionaries, in 1670, in Xích Lam (Ðất Ðỏ), near Bà Rịa, there were nearly 300 Catholic families. According to a report of Bishop M. Labbé, in 1670, "Dong Nai had at least over 2,000 parishioners". According to Adrien Launay, in 1747, the Đồng Nai region already had parish communities in Bengo (Bến Gỗ), R. Dou-nai (Đồng Nai), Dalua (Đá lửa ?) Ke-tat (Cái Tắt / Cái Tắc ?) Dou-mon (Đồng Môn ?), R. Moxoai (Mô Xoài), Ba-ria (Bà Rịa), Nui-nua (Núi Nứa) and Ðất Ðỏ, under the care of MEP and Jesuit missionaries.

Statistics and extent 
As per 2014, the diocese pastorally served 254,302 Catholics (17.8% of 1,427,024 total) on an area of 1,989 km² in 84 parishes with 166 priests (101 diocesan, 65 religious), 799 lay religious (282 brothers, 517 sisters) and 71 seminarians.

Episcopal ordinaries
 Thomas Nguyễn Văn Trâm (22 November 2005 - 6 May 2017), previously Titular Bishop of Hilta (1992.03.06 – 2005.11.22) as Auxiliary Bishop of mother see Xuân Lôc (Vietnam) (1992.03.06 – 2005.11.22)
 Emmanuel Nguyễn Hồng Sơn (6 May 2017 - ...), succeeding as previous Coadjutor Bishop of Ba Ria (27 November 2015 – 6 May 2017)
 Representative General: Joseph Võ Công Tiến
 Director of St. Thomas Hải Sơn Seminary: Joseph Đoàn Như Nghĩa
 Chancellor of the Episcopal See: John the Baptist Nguyễn Văn Bộ
 Chief of Office of the Bishopric: Joseph Nguyễn Công Luận
 Bà Rịa County Governor: Joseph Đặng Cao Trí
 Governor of Vũng Tàu: Matthew Trần Bảo Long
 Long Hương County Governor: Alphonsus Nguyễn Văn Thế
 Bình Giã County Governor: Paul Lê Đình Hùng
 Xuyên Mộc County Governor: Peter Đinh Phước Đại

See also 
 List of Catholic dioceses in Vietnam

References

Sources and external links 
 GCatholic, with Google map & satellite photo - data for all sections
 Catholic-hierarchy.org

Roman Catholic dioceses in Vietnam
Roman Catholic Ecclesiastical Province of Ho Chi Minh City
Ba Ria-Vung Tau Province
Christian organizations established in 2005
Roman Catholic dioceses and prelatures established in the 21st century